Merrilliobryum is a genus of moss in family Fabroniaceae. The genus is found in New Guinea and the Philippines.

The genus name of Merrilliobryum is in honour of Elmer Drew Merrill (1876-1956), who was an American botanist and taxonomist.

The genus was circumscribed by Viktor Ferdinand Brotherus in Philipp. J. Sci., Section C vol.3 on page 25 in 1908.

Species include:
 Merrilliobryum fabronioides Broth.
 Merrilliobryum tanianum

References

Moss genera
Taxonomy articles created by Polbot